Anderson Patric Aguiar Oliveira (born 26 October 1987), known as just Patric, is a Brazilian footballer who plays as a striker. He currently play for Kyoto Sanga.

Club career

Kawasaki Frontale
Patric made his debut for Kawasaki Frontale in the J. League Division 1 on 2 March 2013 against Kashiwa Reysol in which he came on as a 73rd-minute substitute for Yu Kobayashi in which Kawasaki lost 3–1. On 18 July 2013, Patric was sent on loan to Ventforet Kofu.

Sanfrecce Hiroshima
On 2017, Patric transferred to Sanfrecce Hiroshima on loan from Brazilian club, Salgueiro AC. After two seasons at Hiroshima, he was permanently transfer in 2019.

Gamba Osaka
On 2019, Patric return to Gamba Osaka on loan from Sanfrecce Hiroshima since 2014. One year later, he announced permanent transfer from 2020. He left from the club in 2022 after three years at Osaka.

Kyoto Sanga
On 5 December 2022, Patric announcement joining to J1 club, Kyoto Sanga from 2023.

Personal life
In November 2015, he obtained a Japanese driver's license and purchased a private car.

He is enthusiastic about learning Japanese language, and often asks followers on his Twitter if he is right or wrong.

I have an idea that I want to acquire Japanese citizenship in the future and aim to be a member of the Japan national football team.

After the 2015 CS semi-final match against Urawa, he posted a Racial discrimination reply on his Twitter account. "People exist. This time, I received many messages of encouragement not only from Gamba supporters, but also from supporters of other clubs. It strengthened my heart." After receiving an apology from the boy who made the post later, he said, "I want him to look up.

Career statistics

Club 

.

 1 includes J. League Championship appearances and 2 includes Japanese Super Cup and Suruga Bank Championship appearances.

Reserves performance

Honours

Club
Gamba Osaka
J. League Division 1: 2014
Emperor's Cup: 2014, 2015
J. League Cup: 2014
Japanese Super Cup: 2015

Individual
 J. League Cup MVP: 2014

References

External links 

Profile at Sanfrecce Hiroshima
Profile at Gamba Osaka

1987 births
Living people
Brazilian footballers
Brazilian expatriate footballers
Expatriate footballers in Japan
J1 League players
J3 League players
CR Vasco da Gama players
Kawasaki Frontale players
Ventforet Kofu players
Fortaleza Esporte Clube players
Gamba Osaka players
Gamba Osaka U-23 players
Sanfrecce Hiroshima players
Kyoto Sanga FC players
People from Macapá
Association football forwards
Sportspeople from Amapá